The 2016–17 Second League was the 62nd season of the Bulgarian Second League, the second tier of the Bulgarian football league system.

A total of 16 teams contested the league in a similar format to the B Group: 7 of which returning from the 2015–16 season, 7 of which promoted from third division and the reserves teams of Ludogorets Razgrad and CSKA Sofia.

Stadia and locations

Personnel and sponsorship

Note: Flags indicate national team as has been defined under FIFA eligibility rules. Players and managers may hold more than one non-FIFA nationality.

Note: Individual clubs may wear jerseys with advertising. However, only one sponsorship is permitted per jersey for official tournaments organised by UEFA in addition to that of the kit manufacturer (exceptions are made for non-profit organisations).
Clubs in the domestic league can have more than one sponsorship per jersey which can feature on the front of the shirt, incorporated with the main sponsor or in place of it; or on the back, either below the squad number or on the collar area. Shorts also have space available for advertisement.

Managerial changes

League table

Results

Top scorers

Notes

References 

2016-17
Bul
2